Jeroen Recourt (born 4 July 1970 in Dordrecht) is a Dutch politician and former judge. As a member of the Labour Party (Partij van de Arbeid) he was an MP between 17 June 2010 and 23 March 2017. He focused on matters of the judiciary and the Netherlands Antilles.

Recourt worked as a probation officer from 1993 to 1999. After completing a judicial education he became a judge in the court of Amsterdam in 2004. Successively he was a judge of the Joint Court of Justice of the Netherlands Antilles and Aruba in Oranjestad from 2006 to 2010. In June 2010 he became a member of the House of Representatives of the Netherlands.

References

External links 
  House of Representatives biography
 

1970 births
Living people
21st-century Dutch judges
Labour Party (Netherlands) politicians
Members of the House of Representatives (Netherlands)
People from Dordrecht
Aruban judges
Dutch Antillean judges
21st-century Dutch politicians